A discipline is a small scourge (whip) used as an instrument of penance by members of some Christian denominations (including Anglicans and Roman Catholics, among others) in the spiritual discipline known as mortification of the flesh. 

Many disciplines comprise seven cords, symbolizing the seven deadly sins and seven virtues. They also often contain three knots on each cord, representing the number of days Jesus Christ remained in the tomb after bearing the sins of humanity. Those who use the discipline often do so during the penitential season of Lent, but others use it on other occasions, and even every day.

History and practice 

In the Bible, Saint Paul writes: "I punish my body and enslave it, so that after proclaiming to others I myself should not be disqualified" (1 Corinthians 9:27 NRSV). Christians who use the discipline do so as a means of partaking in the mortification of the flesh to aid in the process of sanctification; they also "inflict agony on themselves in order to suffer as Christ and the martyrs suffered." In antiquity and during the Middle Ages, when Christian monastics would mortify the flesh as a spiritual discipline, the name of the object that they used to practice this also became known as the discipline. By the 11th century, the use of the discipline for Christians who sought to practice the mortification of the flesh became ubiquitous throughout Christendom.

In the Roman Catholic Church, the discipline is used by some austere Catholic religious orders. The Cistercians, for example, use the discipline to mortify their flesh after praying Compline. Saints such as Dominic Loricatus, Mary Magdalene de' Pazzi, among others, have used the discipline on themselves to aid in their sanctification.

Votarists of some Anglican religious orders practice self-flagellation with a discipline. Within Anglicanism, the use of the discipline became "quite common" among many members of the Tractarian movement. Martin Luther, the German Reformer, practiced mortification of the flesh through fasting and self-flagellation while still a monk, even sleeping in a stone cell without a blanket. Congregationalist writer and leader within the evangelical Christian movement, Sarah Osborn, practiced self-flagellation in order "to remind her of her continued sin, depravity, and vileness in the eyes of God".

See also 

Conditional preservation of the saints
Repentance (Christianity)
Sackcloth

References 

Christian practices
Christian terminology
Whips